"I Won't Be Crying" is the Danish dance band Infernal's 3rd single released in the UK. "I Won't Be Crying" peaked #1 at the TV-channel The Voice TV Danmark. The music video was directed by Loic Maes and shot in Paris. This is their most viewed video on YouTube, 3 million views .

The song heavily samples "Strangelove", a 1987 song by the English band Depeche Mode.

The UK release date was set to be 21 May 2007. According to the band's website it would have guaranteed them a UK tour, if this single reached #1. The CD single release was cancelled in the UK, due to an apparent lack of media support. However, it did reach #123 in the singles chart due to digital download sales.

Release details

Track listings and formats
UK CD single
"I Won't Be Crying" [radio edit] – 3:02
"I Won't Be Crying" [Beatfreakz club mix] – 6:39

UK Enhanced Maxi single
"I Won't Be Crying" [radio edit] – 3:02
"I Won't Be Crying" [extended version] – 5:34
"I Won't Be Crying" [Beatfreakz club mix] – 6:39
"I Won't Be Crying" [Matt Bradshaw extended mix] – 7:09
"I Won't Be Crying" [Sleaze Sisters mix] – 7:21
"I Won't Be Crying" [Inf: Skru Op! mix] – 7:06
"I Won't Be Crying" [video]

Belgian 12" single
Side 1
"I Won't Be Crying" [Extended version] – 5:35
"I Won't Be Crying" [Beatfreakz club mix] – 7:12
Side
"I Won't Be Crying" [Basto re-dub] – 6:00

Dutch CD/download single
"I Won't Be Crying" [album version] – 3:27
"I Won't Be Crying" [Basto radio dub] – 3:00
"I Won't Be Crying" [extended version] – 5:35
"I Won't Be Crying" [Beatfreakz club mix] – 7:12
"I Won't Be Crying" [Basto re-dub] – 6:00

Australian Maxi single
In Australia, "I Won't Be Crying" was released as a AA side single with "Self Control".
"I Won't Be Crying" [radio edit]
"Self Control" [original version]
"I Won't Be Crying" [extended version]
"I Won't Be Crying" [Beatfreakz club mix]
"I Won't Be Crying" [Matt Bradshaw extended mix]
"Self Control" [Soul Seekerz Remix]
"Self Control" [Robbie Rivera Juicy Mix]
"I Won't Be Crying" [Weekend Wonderz Club Mix]

Other remixes/versions
"I Won't Be Crying" [Beatfreakz dub mix] – 7:10
"I Won't Be Crying" [Gang Bang DJ's Funky remix] – 4:52

Charts

Weekly charts

Year-end charts

References

Infernal (Danish band) songs
Eurodance songs
2007 singles
Songs written by Adam Powers
Songs written by Paw Lagermann
Songs written by Lina Rafn
Songs written by Martin Gore
2007 songs
Island Records singles
Songs about heartache